Paser Regency is a Regency (kabupaten) within East Kalimantan province in Indonesia, it is the southernmost regency of the East Kalimantan province. Its administrative centre is Tana Paser (or Tanah Grogot). It covers an area of 11,603.94 km2, and it had a population of 230,316 at the 2010 Census and 275,452 at the 2020 Census; the official estimate as at mid 2021 was 277,602.
Before 2007, this regency was formerly named Pasir Regency.

Boundaries 
 North : West Kutai Regency and Penajam North Paser Regency
 East : Makassar Strait
 South : Kota Baru Regency
 West : Balangan Regency, Tabalong Regency and North Barito Regency

Administration 
Paser Regency is divided into ten districts (kecamatan), tabulated below with their areas and their populations at the 2010 Census and the 2020 Census, together with the official estimates as at mid 2021. The table also includes the locations of the district administrative centres, the number of administrative villages in each district (totalling 5 urban kelurahan and 139 rural desa), and its postal codes.

Note: (a) including the offshore islands of Pulau Batukapal, Pulau Burung and Pulau Merayap. (b) including the offshore islands of Pulau Rantau Besar and Pulau Rantau Kecil ("Great and Little Rantau Islands"). (c) includes one urban kelurahan (the rest being desa). (d) including the offshore island of Pulau Bansik.

Climate
Tana Paser has a tropical rainforest climate (Af) with moderate rainfall in August and September and heavy to very heavy rainfall in the remaining months.

References